CAConrad (born 1966) is an American poet, professor, and the author of seven books. They were based in Philadelphia and later Asheville, North Carolina and Athens, Georgia.

Early life 
CAConrad was born January 1, 1966, in Topeka, Kansas, and grew up in Boyertown, Pennsylvania. Their mother was a fourteen-year-old runaway and father was a Vietnam War veteran, their mother married three times.

Conrad was bullied as a child and stated in the feature film documentary, The Book of Conrad (2015), "People called me ‘faggot’ more than they called me my name."

Career 
Conrad is known for using and inventing the poetic form of "[Soma]tics." This form is a sort of writing prompt/personal exercise in being engaged in the present moment.

Conrad was one of the two poets in the short film, I Hope I'm Loud When I'm Dead (2018) by filmmaker Beatrice Gibson, also featured was poet Eileen Myles.

Conrad was a 2014 Lannan Fellow, a 2013 MacDowell Fellow, and a 2011 Pew Fellow, they also conduct workshops on (Soma)tic poetry and Ecopoetics. Their book While Standing in Line for Death won a 2018 Lambda Book Award.

In 2019, Conrad cancelled their planned appearance at the Swiss Institute Contemporary Art New York because of the organizations support of artist Tobias Madison, who was accused of domestic violence.

Conrad teaches poetry at Columbia University and the Sandberg Art Institute in Amsterdam.

Personal life 
Conrad identifies as Queer. In 1998, Conrad's boyfriend Mark Holmes (aka. Earth) was violently murdered in Tennessee.

Bibliography
Deviant Propulsion (Soft Skull Press, 2006) , 
Advanced Elvis Course (Soft Skull Press, 2009) , 
The Book of Frank (Wave Books, 2010/Chax Press, 2009) , 
The City Real & Imagined (with Frank Sherlock) (Factory School Books, 2010)
A Beautiful Marsupial Afternoon: New (Soma)tics (Wave Books, 2012) , 
Ecodeviance : (soma)tics for the future wilderness (Wave Books, 2014) , 
PHILIP SEYMOUR HOFFMAN (were you high when you said this?) (Worms Press, 2014)
While Standing in Line for Death (Wave Books, 2017). ,

Filmography

References

Further reading
Soto, Christopher (September 10, 2015). CA CONRAD: ON THE FILM ‘THE BOOK OF CONRAD’ AND HIS LIFE IN POETRY lambdaliterary.org

External links
 
 
 CAConrad's blog
 CAConrad's Author Page at Wave Books
 CAConrad's (Soma)tic Poetry Rituals

21st-century American poets
Living people
Writers from Philadelphia
Pew Fellows in the Arts
Outlaw poets
American LGBT poets
Lambda Literary Award for Gay Poetry winners
Writers from Asheville, North Carolina
People from Boyertown, Pennsylvania
1966 births
Writers from Athens, Georgia
21st-century American LGBT people